The 2021 Aurora Borealis Cup playoffs or the 2021 Naisten Liiga playoffs was the playoff tournament of the 2020–21 Naisten Liiga season. The Naisten Liiga playoffs began on 3 March and the Aurora Borealis Cup was awarded to Kiekko-Espoo, the 38th Finnish Champion in women's ice hockey, on 25 March.

Playoff bracket

Quarterfinals
The best-of-three quarterfinals began on 3 March 2021 and were scheduled to be continued on 6 March with a third 7 March, if necessary. Home ice advantage was granted to the higher seeded teams for the first and potential third games. Each of the four quarterfinal series concluded in two game sweeps in favor of the higher seeded teams.

(1) Kiekko-Espoo vs. (8) Team Kuortane
Kiekko-Espoo earned the first seed after winning the regular season title with 2.41 points per game, marking the team's third consecutive regular season victory, and finished with 65 points in 27 games. Team Kuortane defeated RoKi Rovaniemi in the last game on the last day of the season to claim second place in the lower division series and secure the eighth seed. The teams last met in the 2019–20 Aurora Borealis Cup semifinals, which Kiekko-Espoo won in three games. They faced one another only once during the 2020–21 season, a 5–3 victory for Kiekko-Espoo on 14 November 2020.
Game times in Eastern European Time (UTC+02:00)

(2) KalPa vs. (7) Kärpät
KalPa Kuopio secured the second seed after completing the regular season with 2.24 points per game (56 points in 25 games), propelled by the elite production of forwards Elisa Holopainen, who scored 32 goals and 22 assists (54 points) in 18 games of the qualifiers to rank first in every scoring metric of the series, and Matilda Nilsson, the regular season goal scoring champion, who tallied 8 goals in 7 regular season (upper division) games. Kärpät Oulu topped the lower division standings to secure the seventh seed with 24 points in 10 games. The teams last met in the 2019–20 Aurora Borealis Cup semifinals, which Kiekko-Espoo won in three games. KalPa won both games in this season's series during the Naisten Liiga qualifiers. 
Game times in Eastern European Time (UTC+02:00)

(3) HIFK vs. (6) TPS
Having gained promotion to the Naisten Liiga just two seasons prior, HIFK Helsinki continued their meteoric rise to finish third in the regular season with 2.11 points per game (57 points in 27 games). TPS Turku concluded the season with 1.44 points per game (39 points in 27 games) to finish sixth in the regular season and secure the team's first appearance in the playoffs – an impressive return after narrowly avoiding relegation in the previous season. HIFK won three of four matchups during the 2020–21 season. HIFK forward Michaela Pejzlová, the regular season scoring champion, scored 9 points in the season series with TPS. 
Game times in Eastern European Time (UTC+02:00)

(4) Ilves vs. (5) HPK
Ilves Tampere earned the fourth seed after finishing the season with 47 points in 28 games for a 1.68 points percentage and HPK Hämeenlinna earned the fifth seed after finishing the season with 46 points in 29 games for a 1.59 points percentage. This was the first quarterfinal match-up between the two teams since 2015 and their fourth playoff match-up in ten seasons. HPK won two of the three previous series, including defeating Ilves in the 2011 Aurora Borealis Cup final. HPK won three of four games in this year's season series.

Game times in Eastern European Time (UTC+02:00)

Semifinals

(1) Kiekko-Espoo vs. (4) Ilves
Game times in Eastern European Time (UTC+02:00)

(2) KalPa vs. (3) HIFK
Game times in Eastern European Time (UTC+02:00)

Bronze medal game

Finals
Game times in Eastern European Time (UTC+02:00)

Statistics 
Scoring leaders

The following players were led the league in playoff points at the conclusion of the playoffs on 25 March 2021.

Leading goaltenders

The following goaltenders lead the league in playoff save percentage at the conclusion of the playoffs on 25 March 2021, while playing at least one third of matches.

References

External links
Official statistics from the Finnish Ice Hockey Association 

Naisten Liiga (ice hockey) playoffs